Graphium is a genus of fungi in the family Microascaceae.  Many species are known as plant pathogens. Graphium belongs to the group hyphomycetes and has about 20 species. They are found in soil, plant debris, woody substrate, manure, and polluted water. The sporulating structures of Graphium form synnema, which are a gathering of conidiophores into a sort of flower bouquet. Graphium spp. are recognized by their distinctive, erect, black synnemata, each bearing a single, terminal, ball of one-celled, hyaline conidia produced from annellides.

Species:
Graphium adansoniae 
Graphium adustum 
Graphium ailanthi 
Graphium albiziae 
Graphium albonigrescens 
Graphium album 
Graphium altissimum 
Graphium ambrosiigerum 
Graphium angamosense 
Graphium aphthosae 
Graphium atrovirens 
Graphium basitruncatum 
Graphium bolivarii 
Graphium bulbicola 
Graphium caliciiforme 
Graphium carbonarium 
Graphium cicadicola 
Graphium clavula 
Graphium coffeae 
Graphium comatrichoides 
Graphium coralloides 
Graphium cylindricum 
Graphium dubautiae 
Graphium dulcamarae 
Graphium euwallaceae 
Graphium fabiforme 
Graphium filfilense 
Graphium fissum 
Graphium flexuosum 
Graphium fructicola 
Graphium geranii 
Graphium guttuliferum 
Graphium hamamelidis 
Graphium hendersonulae 
Graphium indicum 
Graphium irradians 
Graphium jumulu 
Graphium klebahnii 
Graphium kuroshium 
Graphium laricis 
Graphium ligulariae 
Graphium madagascariense 
Graphium malorum 
Graphium melanotes 
Graphium minutellum 
Graphium pallescens 
Graphium paspali 
Graphium penicillioides 
Graphium perpusillum 
Graphium pseudormiticum 
Graphium pycnocephalum 
Graphium pyrinum 
Graphium rigidum 
Graphium rubrum 
Graphium samogiticum 
Graphium scolytodis 
Graphium silanum 
Graphium simplex 
Graphium sordidiceps 
Graphium terricola 
Graphium trifolii 
Graphium variabile 
Graphium volkartianum 
Graphium wuweiense 
Graphium xanthocephalum

References

Sordariomycetes genera
Microascales
Taxa named by August Carl Joseph Corda
Taxa described in 1837